Vicki Beggs (born March 25, 1957) is an American former professional tennis player.

A native of Palm Beach, Florida, Beggs played collegiate tennis for the University of Miami and competed on the professional tour in the 1980s. She qualified for the French Open and US Open during her career.

References

External links
 
 

1957 births
Living people
American female tennis players
Miami Hurricanes women's tennis players
Tennis people from Florida
Sportspeople from Palm Beach, Florida